Setomelanomma is a genus of fungi in the family Phaeosphaeriaceae. This is a monotypic genus, containing the single species Setomelanomma holmii.

References

Phaeosphaeriaceae
Monotypic Dothideomycetes genera